Bampur (also Romanized as Bampūr and Bampoor) is a city in and capital of Bampur County, Sistan and Baluchestan Province, Iran. At the 2006 census, its population was 9,073, in 1,664 families.

Location

History
A new fort called Kalah Nasseri, was built at Pahrah, which is known as Iranshahr,  further east, in the 1880s.

Fahraj, which in 1911 had a population of about 2,500, has become more important than Bampur. Fahraj, which is also known as Pahura (or Paharu or Puhra), is by some identified as the Poura where Alexander the Great halted on his march from the Indus Valley.

The majority of the population are ethnic Baloch, who speak the Balochi language.

Archaeology
Bampur is an important site in relation to the ancient Helmand culture of western Afghanistan, and to the closely related Jiroft culture of eastern Iran.

The position of Bampur is near a river and major routes. Thus, prehistoric and later settlements were founded in the area. Sir Aurel Stein carried out reconnaissance here in 1932. In 1966, Beatrice de Cardi excavated next, and she established that there were six successive occupational phases (Periods I-VI) at the site.

There were links with major sites such as Shahr-i Sokhta in Iran, and Mundigak.

During the Period I of Shahr-e Sukhteh (3200–2800 BCE), there were already close connections between that city and the Bampur valley. These contacts also continued in the Period II of Shahr-e Sukhteh.

New ceramics appeared at the end of Period IV, suggesting contact with Iran, Makran, and Oman. Ceramics similar to Shahr-i Sokhta IV (ca. 2200-1800 b.c.) style were introduced in Periods V-VI.

There are also links with Umm an-Nar culture of Oman, dating possibly to the last quarter of the 3rd millennium.

Tepe Yahya in Kerman Province, Iran, is another important site that may be related.

Notes

Helmand culture
Populated places in Bampur County
Cities in Sistan and Baluchestan Province
Jiroft culture